Aphanostephus (dozedaisy) is a genus of flowering plants in the family Asteraceae.

Aphanostephus is native to Mexico, Guatemala, and the southern United States.

 Species
 Aphanostephus jaliscensis Shinners - Jalisco
 Aphanostephus pachyrrhizus Shinners - Hidalgo, México, Puebla, Veracruz
 Aphanostephus perennis Wooton & Standl. - Chihuahua, New Mexico
 Aphanostephus pilosus Buckley	 - Texas, New Mexico, Oklahoma
 Aphanostephus pinulensis J.M.Coult. ex Donn.Sm. -  Guatemala
 Aphanostephus ramosissimus DC.	 - Texas, New Mexico, Oklahoma, Arizona, northeastern Mexico as far south as Puebla
 Aphanostephus riddellii Torr. & A.Gray	 - Coahuila, Texas, New Mexico
 Aphanostephus skirrhobasis (DC.) Trel. ex Coville & Branner - southern USA from Texas to Florida + Kansas

References

Astereae
Asteraceae genera
Flora of North America
Taxa named by Augustin Pyramus de Candolle